Violet Street is the first tram stop in Bendigo, Victoria, Australia, on the Vintage "Talking" Tram network, which is operated by Bendigo Tramways, under the supervision of The Bendigo Trust.

History
The Violet Street Terminus was opened to the public on 9 December 1972, on the opening day of the "Vintage 'Talking' Tram Tours" of Bendigo. Following its closure in April 1972, the former Charing Cross - Golden Square tramway was shortened, and the remaining (and current) tramway was diverted from High Street Bendigo to its current location next to the Central Deborah Gold Mine in Violet Street Bendigo. The stop was created following the closure of the former SEC Bendigo public tramways for tourism purposes and as a means of retaining the tramways of Bendigo.

Facilities
Violet Street consists of a large tram shelter canopy and has toilet facilities available (Disabled Accessible) in the Central Deborah Gold Mine Reception for customers.

References

Trams in Bendigo
Railway stations in Australia opened in 1972
Bendigo